Kushki (also Romanized as Kūshkī) is a village in Veysian Rural District, Veysian District, Dowreh County, Lorestan Province, Iran. At the 2006 census, its population was 189, in 47 families.

References 

Towns and villages in Dowreh County